Hinduism is a minor religion in Malta. It's not recognized as a formal religion in Malta. Hinduism and other Indian religions are labeled as cults in Catholic Malta. In 2010, there were about 840 Hindus in Malta. 

In 2021, Charles J. Muscat wrote Ekam Sat: Il-Verità Waħda: Esperjenza tal-Veda Dharma Ġabra ta' testi ewlenin u riflessjonijiet prattići, an anthology of South Asian religious texts in Maltese including the Vedas and Upanishads.

Community life
A first floor flat is used as a temporary Hindu meeting point that is known as Maltese-Indian Community Centre.

Hindus in Malta privately celebrate Diwali, Holi, Onam, and other Hindu festivals.

Cremation controversy 
Hindu deceased were buried using Catholic burial rites after the British left in 1964, rather than being cremated as required by their religion. Under British rule of Malta, cremation took place at the Lazaretto cemetery in Manoel Island. One Hindu leader in the United States, Rajan Zed, implored the Maltese government in 2019 to subsidize cremations abroad for Hindus in Malta.

Status
Hinduism, along with other Indian religions (like Buddhism, Sikhism and Jainism) and Judaism are not recognized in Malta and are treated as cults. In 2010, Hindu and Jewish groups urged Pope Benedict XVI to intervene to ensure that Malta treats all religions equally before the law, but the Pope did not intervene.

See also

Hinduism in Finland
Hinduism in France
Hinduism in the United Kingdom

External links 

 Ekam Sat via the Times of Malta

References

Hinduism
Malta
Malta